Skirroceras macrum is a Stephanoceratacean (ammonite) species belonging to the family Stephanoceratidae.

These fast-moving nektonic carnivores lived during the Jurassic period, in the Bajocian age.

Description
These ammonites are heavily ribbed, with characteristic nodes.

Distribution
Fossils of Skirroceras macrum are found in the Middle Jurassic Bajocian age marine strata of England and France.

References 

 P. E. BARTOK, O. RENZ and G.E.G. WESTERMANN The Siquisique ophiolites, Northern Lara State, Venezuela: A discussion on their Middle Jurassic ammonites and tectonic implications

External links
 UK Fossils

Jurassic ammonites
Stephanoceratoidea